Brain Electrical Oscillation Signature Profiling (BEOSP or BEOS) is an EEG technique by which a suspect's participation in a crime is detected by eliciting electrophysiological impulses.

It is a non-invasive, scientific technique with a degree of sensitivity and a neuro-psychological method of interrogation which is also referred to as 'brain fingerprinting'.

History 
The methodology was developed by Champadi Raman Mukundan (C. R. Mukundan), a Neuroscientist, former Professor & Head of Clinical Psychology at the National Institute of Mental Health and Neurosciences (Bangalore, India), while he worked as a Research Consultant to TIFAC-DFS Project on 'Normative Data for Brain Electrical Activation Profiling'.

His works are based on research that was also formerly pursued by other scientists at American universities, including J. Peter Rosenfeld, Lawrence Farwell and Emanuel Donchin.

Principle 
The human brain receives millions of arrays of signals in different modalities, all through the waking periods. These signals are classified and stored in terms of their relationship perceived as function of experience and available knowledge base of an individual, as well as new relationship produced through sequential processing. The process of encoding happens primarily when the individual directly participates in an activity or experiences it.

It is considered secondary, when the information is obtained from a secondary source viz. books, conversations, hearsay etc. in which there is no primary experiential component and the brain deals mainly with conceptual aspects.

Primary encoding is deep-seated and has specific source memory in terms of time and space of occurrence of experience, as individual himself/herself has shared or participated in the experience/act/event at certain time in his/her life at a certain place.

It is found that when the brain of an individual is activated by a piece of information of an event in which he/she has taken part, the brain of the individual will respond differently from that of a person who has received the same information from secondary sources (non-experiential).

BEOSP is based on this principle, thereby intending to demonstrate that the suspect who have primary encoded information of those who have participated in the suspected events will show responses indicating firsthand (personally acquired) knowledge of the event.

Procedure 
 Pretest interview with the suspect in BEOSP

 The suspect is acquainted with BEOSP test procedure
 Informed consent is obtained
Ideally, no questions are to be asked while conducting the test; rather, the subject is simply provided with the probable events/scenarios in the aftermath of which, the results are analyzed to verify if the brain produces any experiential knowledge, which is essentially the recognition of events disclosed. This way, all fundamental rights are protected, as neither there are no questions that are being asked or any answers reciprocated.

Applications 
University of Pennsylvania conducted a research along with the Brigham & Women's Hospital (Boston, Massachusetts), Children's Hospital Boston & the University Hospital of Freiburg, Germany which determined that Gamma Oscillations in the brain could help distinguish false memories from the real ones. Their analysis concluded that in the retrieval of truthful memories, as compared to false, human brain creates an extremely distinct pattern of gamma oscillations, indicating a recognition of context based information associated with a prior experience.

Criticism 
India’s Novel Use of Brain Scans in Courts Is Debated as featured on The New York Times
India’s Judges Overrule Scientists on ‘Guilty Brain’ Tech as discussed over Wired (magazine)

See also 
Polygraph
Criminal profiling

External links 

Forensic psychology
Physiological instruments
Forensic equipment
Neurophysiology
Psychology controversies
Lie detection
Fringe science